Rhytidhysteron is a genus of fungi in the family Patellariaceae. It has 21 species.

Species
Rhytidhysteron beccarianum 
Rhytidhysteron brasiliense 
Rhytidhysteron bruguierae 
Rhytidhysteron camporesii 
Rhytidhysteron chromolaenae 
Rhytidhysteron columbiense 
Rhytidhysteron discolor 
Rhytidhysteron dissimile 
Rhytidhysteron erioi 
Rhytidhysteron guaraniticum 
Rhytidhysteron hysterinum 
Rhytidhysteron indicum 
Rhytidhysteron mangrovei 
Rhytidhysteron neohysterinum 
Rhytidhysteron neorufulum 
Rhytidhysteron opuntiae 
Rhytidhysteron prosopidis 
Rhytidhysteron quercinum 
Rhytidhysteron rufulum 
Rhytidhysteron scortechinii 
Rhytidhysteron tectonae 
Rhytidhysteron thailandicum 
Rhytidhysteron viride

References

Dothideomycetes
Dothideomycetes genera
Taxa described in 1881
Taxa named by Carlo Luigi Spegazzini